The highfin dogfish (Centroscyllium excelsum) is a sleeper shark of the family Etmopteridae, found in the northwest Pacific Ocean on the Emperor Seamount chain between latitudes 50 and 38°N, at depths between 800 and 1,000 m.  It reaches a length of 63 cm.

The highfin dogfish is ovoviviparous.

References

External links

 Centroscyllium excelsum at zipcodezoo

Centroscyllium
Taxa named by Shigeru Shirai
Taxa named by Kazuhiro Nakaya
Fish described in 1990